Andreea Rotaru (née: Pricopi; born 20 February 1994 in Brașov) is a Romanian handballer who plays for CSM București.

International honours  
EHF Cup: 
Winner: 2018 
World University Championship: 
Silver Medalist: 2016

References
 

1994 births
Living people
Sportspeople from Brașov
Romanian female handball players